The men's 50 metre breaststroke event at the 2010 Asian Games took place on 14 November 2010 at Guangzhou Aoti Aquatics Centre.

There were 34 competitors from 26 countries who took part in this event. Five heats were held, with most containing the maximum number of swimmers (eight). The heat in which a swimmer competed did not formally matter for advancement, as the swimmers with the top eight times from the entire field qualified for the finals.

Xie Zhi from China won the gold medal, Asian record holder Kosuke Kitajima only finished with fourth place.

Schedule
All times are China Standard Time (UTC+08:00)

Records

Results

Heats

Final

References
 16th Asian Games Results

External links 
 Men's 50m Breaststroke Heats Official Website
 Men's 50m Breaststroke Ev.No.11 Final Official Website

Swimming at the 2010 Asian Games